Ebrahim Asadi (born June 8, 1979) is a retired Iranian footballer who played for Persepolis.

Club career

Club Career Statistics
Last Update  18 September 2010 

 Assist Goals

Honours

Club
Persepolis
Iranian Football League (2) : 1999–2000, 2001–02

References

External links
Persian League Profile

1979 births
Living people
Zob Ahan Esfahan F.C. players
Steel Azin F.C. players
Nassaji Mazandaran players
Iranian footballers
Persepolis F.C. players
Association football midfielders